Rex Goudie (born November 18, 1985) is a Canadian singer-songwriter and was the runner-up of Canadian Idol 3.

Early life
Rex Goudie was born in Dawson Creek, British Columbia and moved back to his father's hometown of Burlington, Newfoundland, Canada with his family when he was a year old. His mother was born in Baie Verte, Newfoundland to a moderately affluent family. Goudie was studying mechanical engineering at Memorial University of Newfoundland as well as working as an auto mechanic part-time for his father's trucking company before Canadian Idol. He received his first guitar for Christmas 1996 from his grandmother.

Musical career
Goudie's musical talents began in Sunday school, where he was encouraged by his grandmother Sophia to sing. By the time he turned sixteen, Goudie had formed a band with his friends, The Purple Monkey Bomb Squad, with a new rock/country focus. The band was moderately popular in Burlington, where they played in local bars after having received written permission to do so from his Grandmother. He was ousted from the band to make room for an older more "experienced" singer, Brandon Mitchell, when he was in grade 12. While frustrating, this inspired Rex to practice longer and harder, honing his skills that would eventually be used in Canadian Idol.

After all votes had been cast on Canadian Idol, Goudie finished as runner-up to winner Melissa O'Neil. On April 6, 2006, she and Rex confirmed in an interview with the CTV entertainment program eTalk Daily that he and O'Neil had been dating since the third week of Canadian Idol. They have since split up.

Although he has been criticized by some of the judges for his stiffness while on stage, a sports collision injury had caused him limited motion in both knees. Goudie missed a knee specialist appointment, in August 2005, due to his progress on Canadian Idol.

Record deal and debut album
In September 2005, Goudie signed a major recording contract with Sony BMG. His debut CD Under the Lights was released on December 13, 2005, and debuted at No. 5 on the Canadian charts, selling 36,000 records in its first week. The album was certified gold in Canada 23 days after its release. In January 2006, Under the Lights was certified platinum by the Canadian Recording Industry Association.

Canadian Idol performances
Songs that Rex performed on Canadian Idol include:

Post-Canadian Idol
On August 29, 2006, Goudie made a special guest appearance on the Top 4 results show of Canadian Idol season 4. After performing his hit single "Run", host Ben Mulroney presented him with an award for his platinum album Under the Lights.

His official biography Idolized, written by St. John's author Kim Kielley, was released in September 2006.

His second album, entitled Look Closer was released on December 12, 2006. The album made its debut at No. 19 on the Canadian charts, and sold over 11,000 copies in its first week. However, two weeks after its release, it fell off the top 100 chart.

In September 2006, Goudie, along with fellow Burlington native Shaun Majumder, started a foundation in their hometown to help raise money for medical needs. The Share Foundation has held several concerts, served with merchandise, and have raised over $50,000 Canadian dollars. The following month, Goudie appeared at the opening ceremonies of the 17th annual Provincial Student Leadership Conference of Newfoundland and Labrador, hosted by Laval High School, where he spoke about the importance of perseverance and getting involved in one's school.

In January 2007, it was revealed that Goudie would be travelling to the United States aboard a cruise ship, performing for the fans that decided to take a trip 'down south' with him. For a week, Goudie performed hits from his new album as well older hits from his platinum album Under The Lights.

In March 2007, he won a Canadian Radio Music Award for Best New Solo Artist (CHR) of the Year.

On Sunday, November 25, 2007, Goudie announced on his MySpace account the news that SONY BMG had indeed dropped him. He stated:

After announcing this, Goudie quickly added that he is in Nashville working on songs for his new album. The album 100 Pages Later was released in December 2010.

In 2011 Goudie guest starred in JHawk23's short comedic skit, Newfoundlander Vs West Side, where he played himself.

Goudie also performed for the St. Anthony Come Home Year in 2017.  That same year, he performed the national anthem at the close of the 2017 Tim Hortons Brier held in St. John's.

Personal life
In early 2010, Rex travelled to Afghanistan to play for Canadian troops.

Discography

Albums

Singles
 "Run" (2005) 
 "Lie Awake" (2006)
 "You Got To Me" (2006)
 "One Good Reason" (2007)
 "Like I Was Dying" (2007)
 "Undone" (2009)

References

External links
 
 The Rexinator Forum
 Rex's Official CTV Bio

1985 births
Living people
Canadian pop singers
Canadian Idol participants
Musicians from Newfoundland and Labrador
Musicians from British Columbia
People from Dawson Creek
People from Newfoundland (island)
21st-century Canadian male singers